Postman is an API Platform for developers to design, build, test and iterate their APIs. As of February 2023, Postman reports having more than 25 million registered users and 75,000 open APIs, which it says constitutes the world's largest public API hub. The company is headquartered in San Francisco and maintains an office in Bangalore, where it was founded.

History 
Postman started in 2012 as a side project of software engineer Abhinav Asthana, who wanted to simplify API testing, while working at Yahoo Bangalore. He launched Postman as a free app in the Chrome Web Store. As the app's usage grew, Abhinav recruited former colleagues Ankit Sobti and Abhijit Kane to help create Postman Inc. The three co-founders lead the company today, with Abhinav serving as CEO and Sobti as CTO.

In 2022, Postman was ranked #28 on the Forbes Cloud 100 list, up from #54 the previous year.

Products

 API repository: Allows users to store, catalog, and collaborate around API artifacts in a central platform within public, private, or partner networks
 API builder: Helps implement an API design workflow through specifications including OpenAPI, GraphQL, and RAML. Integrates varied source controls, CI/CD, gateways, and APM solutions
 Tools: API client, API design, API documentation, API testing, mock servers, and API detection
 Intelligence: Security warnings, API repository search, workspaces, reporting, API governance 
 Workspaces: Personal, team, partner, and public workspaces allow developers to collaborate internally and externally

Plans 
Postman offers a tiered pricing model. Options range from a free plan for small teams to enterprise plans that can serve thousands of developers and offer custom domains, reporting, analytics, governance and enterprise integrations with GitHub and GitLab.

Ownership 
Postman is privately held, with funding from Nexus Venture Partners, CRV, Insight Partners, Coatue, Battery Ventures, and Mary Meeker’s BOND.

References 

Software testing
Automation software
Application programming interfaces